Rene Liu Ruo-ying (born 1 June, 1969) is a Taiwanese singer-songwriter, actress, director and writer. In the Sinophone world, Liu is widely known by her affectionate nickname "Milk Tea". Her music often focuses on love stories and has built an image around herself as a single woman. She is known for her mature, professional, urbane, single woman persona.

She has released 20 albums since 1995 and held hundreds of solo concerts worldwide. She has also had a remarkable acting career, having won numerous awards throughout Asia including Best Actress twice at the Asia-Pacific Film Festival.

Career 
Rene Liu was born in Taipei City, Taiwan on June 1, 1969. She was born to an affluent family in Taipei. Her family from Liling, Hunan. Her grandfather served as a Class 1 general in the Army of the Nationalist Party of Taiwan. Liu's parents divorced when she was young and she grew up in her grandparents' house. In college, Liu attended California State University and has a bachelor's degree in music. 

After returning to Taiwan from her studies in the USA, Liu became the assistant of Bobby Chen (Chen Sheng), a pop music composer, producer, and singer. The two began working together for the release of Liu's album in 1995, with Chen as her music producer.

In 2012, Liu directed her first short film, "Love Limited Edition," where she wrote, produced, directed, and starred in. The film was released on December 18, 2012 and the story is about a woman embarking on a romantic trip to Paris alone, and her introspection and growth towards an understanding of love while traveling. This was the first project that she completed alone during her trip to Paris in 2010.

In 2018, Liu made her directorial debut with her film, Us and Them, a story is about two strangers who meet on a train and fall in love. Their struggles led to their breakup, but 10 years later, they reunite and pick up their story. Us and Them started out as a short story written by Rene Liu and eventually adapted into a movie. The Netflix original film was a huge success in the Chinese box office, making Rene Liu the highest grossing female director for Chinese films. The film became the fifth highest-grossing Chinese movie in 2018, making $157 million in revenue.

Personal life 
On August 8, 2011, Rene Liu married businessman Zhong Xiaojiang (Zhong Shi) in Beijing. In 2015, she gave birth to a son.

Discography

Studio albums 

1995: René's Selected Theme Songs (少女小漁的美麗與哀愁)
1995: Raining Season (雨季)
1996: Walk Around (到處亂走)
1998: Love You More & More (很愛很愛你)
2000: Waiting for You (我等你)
2001: Those Were the Days (年華)
2002: Love and the City
2003: My Failures and Glory (我的失敗與偉大)
2004: I've Heard? (聽說?)
2005: All Night Long (一整夜)
2008: I'm Fine (我很好)
2010: Together (在一起)
2013: For The Loved (親愛的路人)
2015: Wish You Well  (我要你好好的)
2021: Each Well  (各自安好)

Compilation albums 

 2001: Harvest (收穫)
 2003: Rock Hong Kong 10th Anniversary - René Liu Greatest Hits (滾石香港黃金十年-劉若英精選)
 2008: René

Live albums 

 2003: 單身日誌 演唱會LIVE全紀錄
 2012: 劉若英脫掉高跟鞋世界巡迴演唱會 (One Night Stand by Rene 2010-2011)
 2017: 劉若英 Renext 我敢 世界巡迴演唱會 LIVE
 2020: 2020劉若英陪你 獻上錄音專輯

Soundtrack albums 
2004: 20 30 40 (20.30.40 愛得精采)
2007: Happy Birthday (《生日快樂》 電影原聲帶)
2008: Run Papa Run (《一個好爸爸》 電影原聲帶)
2012: C'est Quoi L'Amour? (愛情限量版)

Singles and EPs
 1992: 在這恬靜的暗晡頭 (featuring Ayugo Huang)
1992: 遊子
1992: 思鄉 (featuring Bobby Chen)
1992: 達邦!我的鄉 (featuring Bobby Chen, Ayugo Huang, 劉佳慧)
1992: 黑水溝 (featuring Bobby Chen)
1995: 兩個世界
1997: 男人港 (featuring Bobby Chen)
1998: 大地之歌 (featuring Alex To, Bobby Chen, Chyi Yu, Fish Leong, Karen Mok, Mayday, Michael Wong, Richie Jen, Victor Wong, Wakin Chau, Wanfang, Winnie Hsin, Angelica Lee, Fengie Wang, Bobby Dou, Tarcy Su, Walkie Talkie)
1998: 種子 (featuring Bobby Chen, Michael Wong, Victor Wong, Sylvia Chang, 蕭言中, 阿von, 陳傑漢)
2001: 候鳥
2001: 年華(unplugged)
2002: 一輩子的孤單
2002: 大家來戀愛 (featuring Jeffrey Kung, Yuki Hsu)
2004: 聽!是誰在唱歌? (featuring Kay Huang)
2004: 聽說? (台灣預購限定盤)
2007: 不能跟情人說的話 (featuring FanFan)
2007: 最好的未來 (featuring 乔木楠)
2008: 分开旅行(Remixed) (featuring Stanley Huang)
2011: 沒有旋律配得上你 (featuring Yen-j)
 2014: 半路
2015: 念念 (電影原聲帶)
 2015: 我敢在你懷裡孤獨
 2016: 你有沒有深愛過 (湖南衛視《青雲志》主題曲)
 2017: 粉絲 (電影《二代妖精之今生有幸》片尾曲)
2020: 媽媽
2020: 快樂天堂
2020: 不營業的日常
2020: 每天的不理想 (featuring Kowen Ko)
2021: 黃金年代
2021: 人潮裡
2021: 所有相愛的人啊(熱情版)

Filmography

Film

Television series

Awards and nominations

References

External links

 
 
 
  Official site 
 Rene Liu Introduction and Her Music

1969 births
Living people
Actresses from Taipei
Musicians from Taipei
Taiwanese film actresses
Taiwanese television actresses
20th-century Taiwanese actresses
21st-century Taiwanese actresses
20th-century Taiwanese women singers
21st-century Taiwanese women singers